The 2006 FINA Women's Water Polo World League was the third edition of the annual event, organised by the world's governing body in aquatics, the FINA. Four qualification tournaments were held, before the Super Final took off in Cosenza, Italy from July 26 to July 30, 2006.

Preliminary round

GROUP A
Held from July 3 to July 8, 2006 in Yongzhou, PR China

GROUP B
Held from July 7 to July 9, 2006 in Quebec, Canada

GROUP C
Held from June 30 to July 8, 2006 in Barcelona, Spain and Bochum, Germany

GROUP D
Held from June 30 to July 8, 2006 in Nancy, France and Siracusa, Italy

Semi finals

GROUP E
Held from July 12 to July 16, 2006 in Los Alamitos, United States

GROUP F
Held from July 13 to July 17, 2006 in Kirishi, Russia

July 13, 2006

July 14, 2006

July 15, 2006

July 16, 2006

July 17, 2006

Super Final

July 26, 2006

July 27, 2006

July 28, 2006

July 29, 2006

Play-offs
Sunday July 30, 2006

Final ranking

Final ranking

Individual awards
Most Valuable Player
???
Best Goalkeeper
???

Statistics
Total goals: 1523
Total matches: 77
Goals per match: 19.8
Total of scorers: 172

References

 FINA
Sports123

FINA Women's Water Polo World League
W
International water polo competitions hosted by Italy